Louis Byron Tolley (1889 – 30 April 1959) was a British Labour Party politician who was the Member of Parliament (MP) for Kidderminster from 1945 to 1950. He was the first and only Labour MP for the constituency of Kidderminster.

Biography 
Tolley was born in Kidderminster and worked as an engineer.

Tolley was first elected to Kidderminster Town Council in 1919. In 1923 he was president of the town's Trades and Labour Council, and was the Labour Party's parliamentary candidate at the general election. He was twice mayor of the borough during the Second World War.

At the 1945 general election, he was elected as Member of Parliament for Kidderminster. However, at the next general election in 1950, he lost the seat to the Conservative Party candidate Gerald Nabarro. He rejoined the borough council as an alderman, and was mayor for the third time in 1957. He was made an honorary freeman of the borough in 1958.

References

Times Guide to the House of Commons, 1983

External links 
 

1889 births
1959 deaths
Labour Party (UK) MPs for English constituencies
UK MPs 1945–1950
Councillors in Worcestershire
People from Kidderminster
English trade unionists
Mayors of places in Worcestershire